Pavel Andreev (born 19 July 1992) is a Russian handball player for HC Meshkov Brest and the Russian national team.

He represented Russia at the 2020 European Men's Handball Championship.

References

1992 births
Living people
Russian male handball players
Sportspeople from Saint Petersburg